Arthur Stafford Crawley MC  (18 September 1876 – 8 October 1948) was a Canon of Windsor from 1934 to 1948.

Family
He was born in 1876, the youngest son of George Baden Crawley (1833-1879) and Eliza Inez Hulbert.

He married Anstice Katherine Gibbs, daughter of Antony and Janet Gibbs of Tyntesfield, Somerset in 1903. They had five children.

Army service
He volunteered as an army chaplain in 1915, and joined the Guards Division in Flanders commanded by his brother-in-law Rudolph Lambart, 10th Earl of Cavan. In 1916 he was awarded the Military Cross following the rescue under fire of wounded soldiers. A bar was later added to the MC.

Career

He was educated at Harrow School and Magdalen College, Oxford. He played first-class cricket for Marylebone Cricket Club. He studied for the priesthood at Cuddesdon Theological College.

Following ordination he received the following appointments.
Assistant curate at Stepney 1901 - 1903
Assistant curate at Chelsea 1903 - 1905 
Vicar of Benenden, Kent 1905 - 1910
Vicar of Bishopthorpe 1910 - 1918
Vicar of East Meon, Hampshire 1922 – 1924
Secretary to the York Diocesan board of finance 1924 – 1928
Assistant secretary to the Church of England central board of finance 1928 – 1929
Diocesan secretary to the St Albans Diocese 1929 – 1934
Canon of St George's Chapel, Windsor Castle 1934 – 1948
Chaplain to King George VI 1944 - 1948

Notes 

1876 births
1948 deaths
Canons of Windsor
Recipients of the Military Cross
Alumni of Magdalen College, Oxford
People educated at Harrow School
English cricketers
Hertfordshire cricketers
Marylebone Cricket Club cricketers
A. J. Webbe's XI cricketers